John Sayer (1499–1562) was a Member of the Parliament of England (MP). He represented  Southwark in parliamentary sessions in 1547, March 1553, October 1553, April 1554 and November 1554.

Sayer was a well-to-do "merchant, clothier and innkeeper". He married and had one daughter and two sons. In his will, he left money for an annual payment for the maintenance of a grammar school that he had founded.

References

15th-century births
1562 deaths
English MPs 1547–1552
English MPs 1553 (Edward VI)
English MPs 1553 (Mary I)
English MPs 1554
English MPs 1554–1555